Somnium (Latin for "The Dream") — full title: Somnium, seu opus posthumum De astronomia lunari — is a novel written in Latin in 1608 by Johannes Kepler. It was first published in 1634 by Kepler's son, Ludwig Kepler, several years after the death of his father. In the narrative, an Icelandic boy and his witch mother learn of an island named Levania (the Moon) from a daemon. Somnium presents a detailed imaginative description of how the Earth might look when viewed from the Moon, and is considered the first serious scientific treatise on lunar astronomy. Carl Sagan and Isaac Asimov have referred to it as one of the earliest works of science fiction.

Plot summary
The story begins with Kepler reading about a skillful magician named Libussa. He falls asleep while reading about her. He recounts a strange dream he had from reading that book. The dream begins with Kepler reading a book about Duracotus, an Icelandic boy who is 14 years old. Duracotus' mother, Fiolxhilde, makes a living selling bags of herbs and cloth with strange markings on them. Duracotus is sold by Fiolxhilde to a skipper after cutting into one of these bags and ruining her sale. He travels with the skipper for a while until a letter is to be delivered to Tycho Brahe on the island of Hven (now Ven, Sweden). Since Duracotus is made seasick by the trip there, the skipper leaves Duracotus to deliver the letter and stay with Tycho.

Tycho asks his students to teach Duracotus Danish so they can talk. Along with learning Danish, Duracotus learns of astronomy from Tycho and his students. Duracotus is fascinated with astronomy and enjoys the time they spend looking at the night sky. Duracotus spends several years with Tycho before returning home to Iceland.

Upon his return to Iceland, Duracotus finds his mother still alive. She is overjoyed to learn that he is well-studied in astronomy as she too possesses knowledge of astronomy. One day, Fiolxhilde reveals to Duracotus how she learned of the heavens. She tells him about the daemons she can summon. These daemons can move her anywhere on Earth in an instant. If the place is too far away for them to take her, they describe it in great detail. She then summons her favorite daemon to speak with them.

The summoned daemon tells them, "Fifty thousand miles up in the Aether lies the island of Levania," which is Earth's Moon. According to the daemon, there is a pathway between the island of Levania and Earth. When the pathway is open, daemons can take humans to the island in four hours. The journey is a shock to humans, so they are sedated for the trip. Extreme cold is also a concern on the trip, but the daemons use their powers to ward it off. Another concern is the air, so humans have to have damp sponges placed in their nostrils in order to breathe. The trip is made with the daemons pushing the humans toward Levania with great force. At the Lagrangian point between the Earth and the Moon, the daemons have to slow the humans down lest they hurtle with great force into the Moon.

After describing the trip to Levania, the daemon notes that daemons are overpowered by the Sun. They dwell in the shadows of the Earth, called Volva by the inhabitants of Levania. The daemons can rush to Volva during a solar eclipse, otherwise they remain hidden in shadows on Levania.

After the daemon describes other daemons' behavior, she goes on to describe Levania. Levania is divided into two hemispheres called Privolva and Subvolva. The two hemispheres are divided by the divisor. Privolva never sees Earth (Volva), Subvolva sees Volva as their moon. Volva goes throughout the same phases as the actual Moon.

The daemon continues the descriptions of Subvolva and Privolva. Some of these details are scientific in nature such as: how eclipses would look from the Moon, the size of the planets varying in size due to the Moon's distance from the Earth, an idea about the size of the Moon and more. Some details of Levania are science fiction such as: descriptions of the creatures that inhabit Subvolva and Privolva, plant growth on each side, and the life and death cycle of Levania.

The dream is cut short in the middle of the description of the creatures of Privolva. Kepler wakes up from the dream because of a storm outside. He then realizes that his head is covered and he is wrapped in blankets just like the characters in his story.

Publication history

Development
Somnium began as a student dissertation in which Kepler defended the Copernican doctrine of the motion of the Earth, suggesting that an observer on the Moon would find the planet's movements as clearly visible as the Moon's activity is to the Earth's inhabitants. Nearly 20 years later, Kepler added the dream framework, and after another decade, he drafted a series of explanatory notes reflecting upon his turbulent career and the stages of his intellectual development. The book was edited by Ludwig Kepler and Jacob Bartsch, after Kepler's death in 1630.

Publication
There are many similarities to Kepler's real life in Somnium. Duracotus spends a considerable amount of time working for Tycho Brahe. Kepler worked under Tycho Brahe in 1600 before becoming Imperial Mathematician. Kepler's mother, Katharina Kepler, would be arrested on charges of being a witch. Kepler fought for five years to free her. After her death, Kepler wrote extensive notes to explain his narrative.  
The book was published posthumously in 1634 by his son, Ludwig Kepler.

Science

Levania
Kepler uses a daemon to describe the island of Levania in many scientific ways. The fixed stars are in the same position as the Earth's fixed stars. The planets appear larger from Levania than from Earth due to the distance Levania is from Earth. Levania also sees planetary motions in a different way. For instance, Levania does not seem to move but the Earth seems to orbit around it just as the Moon seems to orbit the Earth whiles on the planet (Earth). This is an example of Kepler defending Copernicus' diurnal rotation. The inhabitants at the divisor see the planets different from the rest of the Moon. Mercury and Venus specifically seem bigger to them.

Privolva
A day is around 14 Earth days sometimes less. Night on Privolva is 15 or 16 Earth days. During the nights, Privolva experiences intense cold and strong winds. During the day, Privolva experiences extreme heat with no wind. During the night, water is pumped to Subvolva. During the Privolvan day, some of the water is pumped back to Privolva to protect its inhabitants from the intense heat. The inhabitants are described as giants that hide under water to escape from the heat of the day.

Subvolva
A day and night is around 30 Earth days. A day on Subvolva represents the Phases of the Moon on Earth. Subvolva sees the Earth as its moon. The Earth goes through phases just as the Moon does during their night. Kepler notes that Subvolva is inhabited by serpent-like creatures. The Subvolvan terrain is full of fields and towns, just like Earth. At night on Privolva all of the water is pumped to Subvolva to submerge the land so only a small portion of land remains above the waves. The Subvolvans are protected from the Sun by almost constant cloud cover and rain.

In popular culture
Fresh Aire V by Mannheim Steamroller is a concept album based on the work, and Kim Stanley Robinson's novel Galileo's Dream draws direct inspiration from it.
In Past Continuous, a novel by the Israeli author Yaakov Shabtai, one of the characters (Goldman) translates Somnium into Hebrew.
Sylvia Brownrigg's novel (2012) and its same-titled cinematic adaptation Kepler's Dream (2016) are based on it.
Dutch multi-instrumentalist Jacco Gardner released a 2018 album, Somnium, as a nod to the novel.

Editions

References

External links
 Christianson, Gale E., Kepler's Somnium: Science Fiction and the Renaissance Scientist
 The Somnium Project: Latin original, English translation, and blog

1608 novels
1634 novels
History of astronomy
1630s science fiction novels
German science fiction novels
Works by Johannes Kepler
17th-century Latin books
Novels set in Iceland
Novels set on the Moon
Novels about dreams
Novels published posthumously
Witchcraft in written fiction